Pay the Ghost is a 2015 American thriller supernatural horror film directed by Uli Edel. The screenplay was written by Dan Kay, based on a short story of the same name by Tim Lebbon. The film stars Nicolas Cage, Sarah Wayne Callies, Veronica Ferres, Lauren Beatty, Jack Fulton, and Elizabeth Jeanne le Roux. The film was released on September 25, 2015, by RLJ Entertainment.

Plot
A professor, Mike Lawford (Nicolas Cage) frantically searches for his son Charlie, who was abducted during a Halloween carnival. As nearly a year goes by,  the parents are still looking for their son and starting to hear and see their son reaching out to them from the other world—Mike sees his son on a passing bus, but upon chasing the bus down and gaining access, his son is not there. He disembarks and notices spray painted on a building, "pay the ghost," the phrase his son uttered before vanishing. He enters the building and finds homeless people living there. Unearthly screams of a woman are heard, and a blind homeless man calls for the others to mask their fires, explaining to Mike that the screams are heard every year before Halloween. Mike asks about the phrase, and is taken to a wall with more of the same phrases written on it. Engrossed by the wall and the homeless man, he does not notice the wall behind him shift into another world, and a demonic figure briefly appears behind him, then vanishes. The homeless man explains nothing, but quickly tells Mike to leave.

His wife Kristen later sees their son's scooter move on its own, and calls him. Later that night while pouring wine, the power in their home goes out. Mike looks out the window to see three children appear and burned at the stake, then turns and sees his apartment crowded with figures of children, standing lifeless and pale. They call a psychic to investigate. Standing in their son's room, she senses nothing, but then abruptly walks to the window, looks at the approaching storm, and says, "It's here... it has all the children." The psychic is then thrown against the wall and strangled before collapsing, burn scars all over her hands. A later autopsy shows her internal organs were burned to ash.

Later, Mike walks upstairs to his wife's room, and she addresses him with their son's voice, pleading for help and saying "She's coming, Dad. I'm scared." He walks closer, and sees his wife cutting herself. Cleaning the wound, they find a symbol, which leads them to a Celtic Halloween celebration. A participant explains that the children are burning dolls to pay the ghost, so they will not be taken. Their friend Hannah who was helping them by doing research calls Mike and says: In early New York, on Halloween night of 1679, because of her Celtic worship, a young widow living on the first New York settlement was burned alive with her three children by an angry mob of settlers suspecting her to be a witch. She takes revenge every year on Halloween, when the border between the spiritual world and the physical world dissolves for a short time. Since then, every Halloween the ghost of this woman takes three living children from their parents and puts them in an alternate world. The borders solidify until next Halloween, and the children taken are able to reach out and be rescued. But if the children cannot escape this alternate world within the first year, they are stuck in this world forever.

After Mike and Kristen are injured in the taxi by a flock of black vultures, Hannah is thrown out of a window and killed while trying to leave the institute. Mike returns to the same building and finds the blind homeless man again, he gives him his watch in exchange for helping him find his son Charlie. He shows Mike the hazy road and tells him that he has  until Halloween ends at midnight, otherwise he will be trapped there forever. Mike arrives at the widow's cabin and goes down to the basement where he finds the souls of many children who were locked up over the centuries at Halloween time. Mike finally finds Charlie along with two other children that were also taken within the last year.

While the four of them are escaping, the ghost widow appears as she has learned that they were attempting to escape. She tries to stop Mike from taking the three children away by trying to kill him. All of the other children’s souls arrive to help him, and they are able to kill the ghost widow by surrounding her, unknowingly freeing themselves into the afterlife. Mike and the children manage to get out just as the portal closes. At dawn, Mike and his son Charlie finally make it home. While reuniting with Kristen it is revealed that Charlie has no recollection of the time that he spent missing. Outside, a black vulture is seen flying away.

In a scene mid-credits, three black vultures appear surrounding Hannah's corpse and she awakens, possessed.

Cast
 Nicolas Cage as Mike Lawford
 Sarah Wayne Callies as Kristen
 Veronica Ferres as Hannah
 Lyriq Bent as Detective Jordan Reynolds
 Lauren Beatty as Annie Sawquin 
 Sam Velasquez as Professor Oak 
 Kalie Hunter as Ghost Annie
 Jack Fulton as Charlie
 Stephen McHattie as Blind Man
 Susannah Hoffmann as Jane
 Caroline Gillis as Priestess
 Janet Lo as Jai Wen
 Erin Boyes as Emily (Sexy female student wearing horns)
 Juan Carlos Velis as Morales (Cop)
 Alex Mallari Jr. as EMT
 Darren Frost as Ice Cream Vendor
 Matteo Ghazni as Pablo

Production
On May 15, 2014, Nicolas Cage joined the cast. On August 25, 2014, Sarah Wayne Callies joined the cast. On September 5, 2014, Veronica Ferres joined the cast. On September 4, 2014, Lyriq Bent joined the cast. Principal photography began in September 2014, in Toronto, Canada.

Release
On August 6, 2015, it was announced RLJ Entertainment had acquired distribution rights to the film, and set a September 23, 2015, limited release and video on demand release date. The film was released on September 25, 2015, in a limited release, and through video on demand.

Reception
Pay the Ghost received negative reviews from critics.  On Metacritic, the film has a score of 23 out of 100, based on 9 critic reviews, indicating "generally unfavorable reviews".

Andrew Barker of Variety wrote: "This somnolent supernatural thriller is a low-energy wash from start to finish." Brian Tallerico of Roger Ebert.com declared it a "new low" for Nicolas Cage, and branded the movie a "lazy, boring retread of Insidious.

References

External links
 

2015 films
2015 horror films
American horror thriller films
2015 horror thriller films
Films based on Celtic mythology
Films directed by Uli Edel
American supernatural horror films
2010s English-language films
2010s American films